Johann Sebastian Bach composed the church cantata  (O eternity, you word of thunder), 20, in Leipzig for the first Sunday after Trinity and first performed it on 11 June 1724. Bach composed it when beginning his second year as Thomaskantor in Leipzig. It is the first cantata he composed for his second annual cycle which was planned to contain chorale cantatas, each based on a Lutheran hymn. The cantata is focused on Johann Rist's 1642 hymn "", with a chorale melody by Johann Schop. As usual for Bach's chorale cantatas to come in the cycle, selected hymn stanzas were retained while the others were paraphrased by a contemporary poet who transformed their ideas into a sequence of alternating recitatives and arias. For this cantata, the first stanza was used unchanged, and two more stanzas to conclude the cantata's two parts. The first part was performed before the sermon, the second part after the sermon. The first part is in seven movements, and the second part is in four movements.

Bach scored the cantata for three vocal soloists, a four-part choir and a Baroque instrumental ensemble of two tromba da tirarsi, three oboes, two violins, viola and basso continuo. Schop's chorale melody appears in the opening chorale fantasia and in the identical four-part harmonisation closing the cantata's two parts. All instruments play in the opening chorale fantasia, in which the soprano sings the hymn tune as a cantus firmus. It is written in the style of a solemn French Overture, opening both the cantata and the second cantata cycle.

History and words 

Bach composed the cantata in 1724 for the First Sunday after Trinity. The Sunday marks the beginning of the second half of the liturgical year, "in which core issues of faith and doctrine are explored". He was responsible for the education of the Thomanerchor, performances in the regular services in the Thomaskirche, the Nikolaikirche and others. During his first year, he started composing one cantata for each Sunday and holiday of the liturgical year, termed by the Bach scholar Christoph Wolff as "an artistic undertaking on the largest scale". In 1724, Bach began exclusively composing chorale cantatas for his second annual cantata cycle, beginning with this cantata and totaling some 40 chorale cantatas by the end of the cycle. Each cantata was based on the main Lutheran hymn for the respective occasion. Leipzig had a tradition of focusing on the hymns. In 1690, the minister of the Thomaskirche, Johann Benedikt Carpzov, announced that he would preach also on songs and that Johann Schelle, then the director of music, would play the song before the sermon.

The prescribed readings for the Sunday were from the First Epistle of John, "God is Love"
(), and from the Gospel of Luke, the parable of the Rich man and Lazarus. The text is based on Johann Rist's hymn "", which was published in the collection  (Heavenly songs) in Lüneburg in 1642. The text is based on 12 of the hymn's 16 stanzas. The hymn, reflecting death and eternity, corresponds well to the parable of the rich man who has to face death and hell. It is subtitled "" (A serious consideration of endless eternity). The text of three stanzas (stanzas 1, 8 and 12, used for movements 1, 7 and 11) is kept unchanged. An unknown author rephrased the other stanzas of the chorale to recitatives and arias, generally alternating and using one stanza for one cantata movement. The poet combined two stanzas, 4 and 5, to form movement 4. He used the lines "" (Perhaps this is your last day, no one knows when he might die) from stanza 9 in movement 9 which is otherwise based on stanza 10. In movement 10, he inserted a hint at the Gospel. Overall, the poet stayed close to the hymn's text, which is characteristic for the early cantatas in Bach's second annual cycle. The poet was possibly Andreas Stübel, who died in 1725, which would explain why Bach did not complete the full cycle, but ended on Palm Sunday.

The chorale theme was composed by Johann Schop for the hymn "", which appeared in the collection . It was assigned to the text by Johann Franck in his 1653 edition of Praxis pietatis melica. The tune is featured in all three movements which use Rist's original text.

Bach first performed the cantata on 11 June 1724.

Music

Structure and scoring 
Bach structured the cantata in two parts. Part I contains seven movements and is to be performed before the sermon while Part II has four movements and is to be performed after the sermon. Part I begins with a chorale fantasia, and both parts are concluded by the same four-part setting of two other stanzas of the chorale. The inner movements are mostly alternating recitatives and arias, with the last aria a duet. Bach scored the work festively for three vocal soloists (alto (A), tenor (T) and bass (B)), a four-part choir (SATB), and a Baroque instrumental ensemble: tromba da tirarsi (slide trumpet, Tt), three oboes (Ob), two violins (Vl), viola (Va), and basso continuo (Bc). Alfred Dürr gave the cantata's duration as 31 minutes.

In the following table of the movements, the scoring follows the Neue Bach-Ausgabe. The keys and time signatures are taken from Dürr, using the symbol for common time (4/4). The instruments are shown separately for winds and strings, while the continuo, playing throughout, is not shown.

Movements 
The opening chorus, beginning not only the cantata but also the second annual cantata cycle, is in the style of a solemn French Overture in the typical three sections slow – fast (vivace) – slow. The French Overture was designed to mark the entry of the king. The melody is sung by the soprano as a cantus firmus in long notes, doubled by the slide trumpet. The chorale is in bar form. The first Stollen of three lines is handled in the slow section, the second Stollen of lines 4 to 6 in the fast section, the Abgesang of lines 7 an 8 in the concluding slow section. The lower voices are mostly in homophony. The development of themes happens in the orchestra. The rising theme of the slow section in dotted rhythm is derived from the beginning of the chorale tune, whereas the theme of the fast section is not related to the tune. The fast section is not a strict fugue. Bach uses a number of musical illustrations to complement the text: "" (eternity) is rendered in long notes in the lower voices and the instruments; "" (thunderous word) appears as a sudden change to short notes with a melisma in the bass; on the words "" (great sadness), a downward chromatic line from the instrumental counterpoint in the fast section also appears in the voices; "" (terrified) is rendered in jarred rhythms interrupted by rests, first in the orchestra, then also in the voices; "" (cleave) is a long note in the voices. John Eliot Gardiner, who conducted the Bach Cantata Pilgrimage in 2000, summarizes regarding the cantata: "Confronted by the baffling and disquieting subject of eternity, and specifically the eternity of hell, Bach is fired up as never before".

The recitatives are mostly secco, with an arioso only in movement 9 on the words "" (splendor, pride, riches, honor, and wealth) from the chorale. The arias, by contrast, interpret the text in its affekt and in single phrases. Gardiner notes the following about the first pair of recitative and aria:  In movement 8, the call to wake up is intensified by trumpet signals and fast scales, evoking the Last Judgement. The first motif in movement 10 is sung by the two singers of the duet on the words O Menschenkind ("o child of man") and are repeated instrumentally as a hint of that warning. Both parts of the cantata are concluded by the same four-part chorale setting, asking finally "" (Take me, Jesus, if you will, into the felicity of your tent).

Recordings 
The entries of the following table are taken from the list of recordings provided on the Bach Cantatas Website. Ensembles playing on period instruments in historically informed performance and a choir of one voice per part (OVPP) are marked by green background.

References

Bibliography 
General
 

Books
 
 

Online sources

External links 
 
 

Church cantatas by Johann Sebastian Bach
1724 compositions
Chorale cantatas